Diefenbach is an Ortsgemeinde – a municipality belonging to a Verbandsgemeinde, a kind of collective municipality – in the Bernkastel-Wittlich district in Rhineland-Palatinate, Germany.

Geography 

The municipality lies at the edge of the Eifel on the river Demichbach in a side valley of the river Alf. The municipal area is 63% wooded. The nearest middle centre is Wittlich to the south. Diefenbach belongs to the Verbandsgemeinde of Traben-Trarbach.

History 
Beginning in 1794, Diefenbach lay under French rule. In 1814 it was assigned to the Kingdom of Prussia at the Congress of Vienna. Since 1947, it has been part of the then newly founded state of Rhineland-Palatinate.

Politics 

The municipal council is made up of 6 council members, who were elected by majority vote at the municipal election held on 7 June 2009, and the honorary mayor as chairman.

Economy and infrastructure 
To the west runs the Autobahn A 1. In Ürzig is a railway station on the Moselstrecke (Moselle Line).

References

External links 
 Brief portrait with film about Diefenbach at SWR Fernsehen 

Bernkastel-Wittlich